Gehdich (also Romanized as Gehdīch; also known as Gahdīj, Gahīdīch, Gehdīj, and Geydīch) is a village in Kuh Panj Rural District, in the Central District of Bardsir County, Kerman Province, Iran. At the 2006 census, its population was 55, in 7 families.

References 

Populated places in Bardsir County